Mathias Kauage O.B.E. (1944 in Miugu, Chimbu Province, Papua New Guinea – May 2003) was a Papua New Guinean artist. In 1998, Kauage was awarded the Order of the British Empire for services to the arts by Queen Elizabeth II. The National Gallery of Australia has described him as "Papua New Guinea's best-known contemporary artist". He was still holding regular exhibitions abroad shortly before his death, in Australia, Europe and Africa.

Kauage's art included drawing, painting and woodcuts. His career as an artist was reportedly inspired by visiting an exhibition of Timothy Akis' in 1969.

He was unrelated to fellow artist Chris Kauage, although the two were friends.

References

Papua New Guinean painters
Members of the Order of the British Empire
1944 births
2003 deaths
People from Chimbu Province
20th-century Papua New Guinean painters